Yalí is a town and municipality located in northeastern Antioquia Department, Colombia, colloquially called "the town of hills". Part of the subregion of Northeastern Antioquia. Yalí was established as a municipality in 1956 and was named after one of its founders; Lorenzo Yalí. In its early days the town's economy relied on mining, now the economic activity is focused on the "cañicultura" (sugarcane plantations) with aims of production of panela.

References
 Yalí official website

Municipalities of Antioquia Department